Francisco Javier Del Riego Flores (born 24 March 1993) is an Argentine professional footballer who plays as a goalkeeper for Almagro.

Career
Del Riego began in the ranks of Atlético Rivadavia, which preceded a move to Gimnasia y Esgrima. His first senior career club was Villa San Carlos. He was promoted into their first-team squad in October 2014, making five appearances including his debut against Deportivo Morón on 2 October. Del Riego remained for three further seasons whilst featuring in forty-nine fixtures, prior to departing on 30 June 2017 after agreeing to sign for Sportivo Patria of Torneo Federal A. He was selected twenty-three times by the club in the 2017–18 campaign. In August 2018, Del Riego joined Primera B Nacional side Almagro.

After no appearances for Almagro, Del Riego headed to Torneo Federal A with Ferro Carril Oeste in July 2019. After debuting in a draw away to Cipolletti on 1 September, he went on to appear twenty-three times in all competitions for the General Pico club. Del Riego, on 9 August 2020, sealed a return to Almagro.

Career statistics
.

References

External links

1993 births
Living people
Sportspeople from Buenos Aires Province
Argentine footballers
Association football goalkeepers
Primera B Metropolitana players
Torneo Federal A players
Club Atlético Villa San Carlos footballers
Sportivo Patria footballers
Club Almagro players